Charles Beichman is the current executive director of NASA Exoplanet Science Institute (2003–Present), senior faculty associate at California Institute of Technology  and an astronomer. In 1975 Beichman received an M.S. in astronomy from University of Hawaii, In 1976 he received an M.S. in physics from University of Hawaii, and in 1979 he received a PhD in astronomy. He has published numerous papers within his field, including research on exoplanets and Debris disks and is most notably credited with the discovery of a planetary system using IRAS.

References

NASA people
California Institute of Technology
California Institute of Technology faculty
American astronomers
University of Hawaiʻi alumni
1952 births
Living people